Cottage Hill is an unincorporated community in Muskingum County, in the U.S. state of Ohio.

History
A post office called Cottage Hill was established in 1855, the name was changed to Cottagehill in 1895, and the post office closed in 1902. Besides the post office, Cottage Hill had a country store.

References

Unincorporated communities in Muskingum County, Ohio
1855 establishments in Ohio
Populated places established in 1855
Unincorporated communities in Ohio